Clarence Washington (born December 23, 1946) is a former American football defensive tackle who played three seasons in the National Football League (NFL) for the Pittsburgh Steelers from 1969 to 1971. He played college football at the University of Arkansas at Pine Bluff, where he played alongside and roomed with future Steeler teammate L.C. Greenwood.  According to sportswriter Jack Zanger, he and Greenwood both "demonstrated that they were worthy backup men" in 1969.  Washington played in 13 games as a backup tackle in 1969 and then in all 14 games in 1970.  Washington missed the 1971 season after suffering a broken leg during preseason workouts.  He was traded to the Chicago Bears prior to the 1972 season for a draft pick due to the Steelers' surplus of quality defensive linemen, but the deal was voided because Washington failed the physical exam.

References

1946 births
Living people
American football defensive tackles
Pittsburgh Steelers players
Arkansas–Pine Bluff Golden Lions football players
Players of American football from Arkansas
Sportspeople from Little Rock, Arkansas